La Fada Morgana (English: Fairy Morgana) is a Catalan fairy tale or rondalla, first collected by Majorcan priest and author Antoni Maria Alcover. It is related to the cycle of the Animal as Bridegroom and distantly related to the Graeco-Roman myth of Cupid and Psyche, in that the heroine is forced to perform difficult tasks for a witch.

Summary
A powerful and wise queen named Fairy Morgana wants to marry her son Beuteusell to an equally wise maiden. In order to prove herself, the bride-to-be must pass a series of tests designed by the Queen.

Prince Beuteusell meets a peasant maiden named Joana and asks her father's approval for their marriage. Her father boasts that Joana is even wiser than the queen Fairy Morgana, and a maidservant overhears it. She tells the queen of the boast and she summons father and daughter to her court. The queen dismisses the father, but orders Joana to stay, for she intends to set a difficult task for the girl.

The task is to visit Fairy Morgana's mother and ask the old woman for two boxes containing songs inside: the capsa del Bon Jorn and the capsa del congrás. Beuteusell talks to Joana in secret and gives her information on how to approach his grandmother.

Joana passes through a field and compliments a tree stump, and helps a man that was cleaning a stove. At last, she reaches the seven-gated castle of Fairy Morgana's mother. She announces herself and enters the royal chamber. The old queen asks her some riddles, which Joana answers correctly, and gets the boxes.

As a last hindrance for the couple, Fairy Morgana asks Joana on the wedding day which rooster is crowing, to which Joana answers: "el Ros" - as it was instructed by Beuteusell. Joana and Beuteusell are finally married.

Analysis

Tale type
The tale is connected to the cycle of Cupid and Psyche, and, more especifically, to the Aarne-Thompson-Uther Index type ATU 425B, "The Son of the Witch" (Catalan: El desencantament del princep: les tasques de la bruixa).

Catalan scholarship classifies the tale as type ATU 428, "The Wolf", a type that  considered to be only a fragmentary version of his type 425A. Accordingly, German folklorist Hans-Jörg Uther revised the international classification system and subsumed previous type 428 under the new type ATU 425B, "Son of the Witch".

Motifs
Catalan scholarship locates the motif of the box of musical instruments in Greek, Turkish and South Italian variants.

The antagonist, Fairy Morgana, has also been compared to her possible namesake, the Arthurian fairy and sorceress Morgan Le Fay. Morgana also appears as the name of the female antagonist in other Catalan folktales of type 425B.

According to Danish scholar Inger Margrethe Boberg, the heroine's helper in type 428 may be a young man cursed to be an animal in Northern Europe, while in variants from Southern Europe her helper is the witch's own son, who falls in love with the heroine.

Variants

Spain

Catalan-speaking areas 
According to Catalan philologist Caterina Valriu, the tale type was "rarely" found in continental Spain, but has "numerous" variants in the Balearic Islands. Indeed, other Catalan variants of the tale type were located in Mallorca, Catalunya and Eivissa.

In a Valencian variant collected by author Enric Valor i Vives with the title El castell d'entorn i no entorn, poor girl Teresa gives water to a hermit and receives a magic book in return. She opens the book; a ghostly figure of a prince answers from within the book and tells her to go the castle of "Serra dels Plans". There, she seeks employment with Queen Tomanina, mother of Prince Bernat. One day, the queen's elderly housekeeper lies to the queen that the girl boasted that she could accomplish great things. Then, Teresa is tasked with unstitching and cleaning the mattresses of the entire palace, then filling them with feathers. She does with a little help from Prince Bernat. Teresa's next task is to go to the queen's sister, Argelagaina, and to get two boxes from her, La Caixeta d’Entorn i Entorn and La Caixeta de les Caterinetes. Bernat advises her to be kind to the animals on the way (mosquitoes, a snake and two bulls), to a baker cleaning an oven and to the castle doors. Teresa gets the box and flees from Argelagaina's castle. On the way back, she opens the box and a horde of little musicians spring out of it. Bernat warns her to use a magic flute to summon everyone back to the box. Lastly, Queen Tomanina orders Teresa to light the castle's large candelabra for Bernat's wedding.

In a Mallorcan variant collected with Alcover in his series  with the title Es Negret ("The Little Black Man"), a poor widow lives with her daughter, named Na Catalineta. One day, they steal some cherries from a cherry tree guarded by a Black man (a negret), and flee, the Black man on their trail. The mother asks her daughter to dig up a hole and hide her in it, leaving only an ear visible. The Negret finds Na Catalineta’s mother and makes her promise to give him her daughter within a year and a day. Time passes, and, one day, the Negret warns Na Catalineta to remind her mother of her promise. After some insistence, the Negret explains he was promised the girl, and takes her to a house of two Madones. Despite kidnapping the girl, the Negret tells her he can call on him for help in whatever chores the Madones demand of her. And so it happens: first, the Madones order Na Catalineta to take a jug and fill it with the water of seven wells. The girl cries for a bit, when the Negret appears to her and agrees to help, in exchange for a kiss. Despite the girl’s refusal, the Negret helps her. Next, the Madones force her to wash a tuft of black wool white. Thirdly, they order Na Catalineta to go to the Ca-ses Ties de fora-Mallorca and get xeremietes for N’Antonina’s upcoming wedding. The Negret appears to Na Catalineta and advises her to compliment a stream, then a hedge, a herd of toads and a herd of serpents, oil two large doors, enter the house and give a slice of bread to a cusseta (a little black dog), steal a key and take a capseta (a little box) of the xeremietes, then run all the way back. Na Catalineta follows his instructions, and brings the box with her, but opens it to see what the xeremietes are, and a little green bird escapes. The Negret appears again and locks the green bird inside the box, and tells the girl to hurry back to the Madones with the object, for the pair will ask her to identify which rooster will crow the next morning, so that they can find the best time for the wedding. The Madones place the green bird on a stake, give it to Na Catalineta, and order her to spend the night in the hen house with a light source, where she is to identify the rooster. Some time later, Na Catalineta trades places with N’Antonina, who holds the light until the last rooster, “En Rom”, crows. Her mother then commands the torch to explode, which kills her own daughter. When morning comes, N’Antonina’s mother goes to the hen house to try and kill Na Catalineta, but the Negret stops her and wrings her neck. The Negret changes into a prince and tells Na Catalineta he was cursed by the Madones, then asks her to marry him.

In another Mallorcan tale titled Na Juana i la fada Mariana ("Juana and Fairy Mariana"), a poor man has a beautiful daughter named Joana, who he boasts is wiser than Fada Mariana, the queen. A queen's servant hears the boast and reports back to the monarch, who sends for the girl and her father. Fairy Mariana has a son named Bernadet, who also possesses powers like his mother, and falls in love with Na Juana, promising to help her if she calls him with a command. Later, Fairy Mariana orders Na Juana to wash a pile of black wool white, for Bernat's upcoming wedding. Na Juana cries over the task; Bernadet appears and, after hearing her plea, summons an army of small men and women to fulfill the task. Next, the queen gives the girl tons of hemp and wool, and orders her to spin them and sew a garment for her son. Lastly, she orders the girl to mend, fold and wash every clothe in the castle. Seeing Na Juana fulfilled every task she forced on her - despite the girl's adamant denial of her son's involvement -, Fairy Mariana explodes in anger, and Bernadet marries Na Juana.

In a Catalonian tale published by folklorist Joan Amades with the title La donzella Rosana i la vella Mariagna ("The Maiden Rosana and The Old Mariagna"), queen Mariagna is a powerful witch, who dislikes having someone being wiser than her. One day, Rosana's poor father passes by the queen's house and boasts that his daughter is wiser than the queen, which the maidservants hear and report to their mistress. Queen Mariagna then makes an offer to Rosana's father that she will buy his daughter and bring her to her castle. The man agrees and Rosana is brought to live with the queen and is forced to perform tasks for the witch queen: first, to bleach a piece of dark gray wool ("lana burella"), then to weave and sew clothes for the prince in one night with a cartload of linen. However, the maiden prevails with the help from the queen's son, prince Joan, who gives her a magic ring to fulfill the queen's tasks. At the end of the tale, they marry.

Murcia 
Spanish academic Ángel Hernandez Fernandez abstracted the common traits from a tale from Jumilla and another from Cartagena (both located in the Region of Murcia), and developed a tale type from the region with the same typing, ATU 425B. In his system of Murcian folktales, type 425B, El pájaro ayudante ("The helpful bird"), the heroine leaves home to escape mistreatment from her step-family and finds employment in a castle. There, the queen, based on false claims by the other servants, forces the heroine on difficult tasks, which she accomplishes with the help of a bird (that may be changed into a prince at the end of the story).

In a tale from Jumilla collected by researcher Pascuala Morote Magán with the title Pajarito Verde ("Little Green Bird"), a girl finds a bird who gives her a mantilla and a teja (a tile), and she leaves home from her step-family to work in the king's castle. One day, the queen gives her a bottle to fill with birds' tears. The girl summons the little green bird to help her, and he orders all birds to come and cry over the bottle. Next, the queen asks her to find a ring she lost in the sea: the bird summons the fishes, one speckled, the second white, and the third green, and she brings the queen's ring. Thirdly, the queen orders her to go to the castle of Irás y No Volverás. The little green bird advises her how to reach it: she will find an ox eating meat and a wolf eating hay, which she is to place for the right animal; then, she will find a woman cleaning an oven with a boja (a sort of stone), whom she is to give a stick to help her; lastly, she is to enter the castle only when a woman is sleeping with her eyes open, get the caja de los caudales, and escape. The girl takes the box and its keeper wakes up, ordering the woman at the oven and the animals to stop her, but they remain still. On the way back, she enters the church where the king's son was asleep with candles on his toes and crashes into the altar.

Other regions 

In a variant from Cádiz, collected from teller Carmen Pérez Galván, from Chiclana de la Frontera with the title Rosa, a young woman named Rosa lives with her travelling father. Their neighbour, a widow with two daughters, tells Rosa to convince her father to marry her. She does, and, as time passes, their neighbour, now her stepmother, mistreats the girl and favours her two biological daughters. The last straw is when the stepmother tells Rosa to seek employment somewhere else, since Rosa draws any suitor's attention away from the step-sisters. Rosa leaves home and meets an old lady on the way, who directs her to a castle, to work for the lady of the castle, the queen, as her hairdresser. Eventually, the castle's servants, jealous of Rosa's talents and kindness, lie to the queen that she boasted she could do impossible things. The queen summons Rosa to her presence, and comments about the false boasts: that she can find the queen's missing son, and that she can clean all the palace overnight. Rosa goes to her bedroom and cries about the task, when a knight knocks on the door and tells her not to worry, for everything will be done the next morning. The next day, the whole palace is clean, from top to bottom. The other servants spread another rumour: that Rosa can wash and iron all the clothes of the palace's inhabitants. The same knight knocks on the door and tells her not to worry. By the next morning, the clothes are washed and ironed. Lastly, the queen reminds Rosa about the boast that she can locate her son, who has been missing for 20 years. The knight instructs Rosa to escape by a castle backdoor into an alleyway, carrying a sack of straw, a bag of bones, a comb, a piece of bread and a satchel of tobacco. The girl must go on until she finds two bulls (to which she must give the straw), two dogs (to which she must give the bones) and a long-bearded old man cleaning an oven with his long fingernails (to whom she must give the comb, the bread and the tobacco). At the end of the journey, she must ring a doorbell, and a witch will let her in. Inside, she will find a box surrounded by four candles. The girl is to put out the candles, take the box, and return to the castle by the backdoor. The girl follows the knight's instructions to the letter, and brings the box to the queen. The queen opens the box and her son comes out of it. The prince and Rosa marry. The tale was also classified as type 425B.

Folklorist Sérgio Hernandez de Soto collected a tale from Zafra, Badajoz, with the title Los Tres Claveles ("The Three Carnations"). In this tale, a poor laborer has a daughter. One day, he finds in the fields three carnations and brings them to his daughter. The girl is cooking, and one of the carnations falls in the fire, and a prince appears to her. The youth tries to talk to her, but she does not answer, and he tells her she will have to seek him in the "piedras de toito el mundo" ("the rocks of all the world"). The second and the third claveles also fall in the fire, and summon a second and a third princes. María, the girl, falls in love with the third prince and decides to look for the rocks of all the world. María climbs a large rock and begins to cry. Suddenly, a rock cracks open and the third prince appears to comfort her. As she still will not talk, the prince directs her to a house in the valley, where she can find work as a maidservant. María goes there and is hired as a servant. She earns her employer's trust and the jealousy of the other servants, who lie to their mistress that María can wash all the clothes in the house. Maríes takes the clothe piles to the river and goes to the rocks to cry. The third prince appears again and advises her to summon all birds of the world to help her. Next, the story explains that the mistress of the house lost her three sons, and cried to much her sight has deteriorated. So, the servants lie that María can find her a cure for her sight. The third prince advises her to summon all the birds again, and every one of them will carry a drop in their feathers to fill the flask. Finally, the other maidservants lie that María promises to disenchant the mistress's three sons. María is advised by the third prince to summon all the maidens from the neighbouring villages, have each carry a lit candle, and they must form a procession around the rocks, and must not let any candle be put out. María follows his orders and a procession circles the rocks, but a gust of wind snuffs out María's candle and she shouts. The three rocks disappear and the three princes are back to normal. The third prince explains that the one who burned the carnation should talk to him, in order to break the spell. María marries the third prince. Writer Elsie Spicer Eells translated the tale as The Carnation Youth, in her book Tales of Enchantment from Spain, albeit making the third prince an only son.

In this tale, a king locks his only daughter in a high tower to protect her from the world. However, when she is old enough, she peers outside the tower and marvels at the moonlight. Some days later, she decides to leave the tower and wander the world. One day, she cries in the middle of the road, when a ram appears to her. The animal asks for a kiss; she refuses, but it agrees to accompany her. Later, the ram guides her to a house where she finds work for a mother and her daughter, who are secretly a pair of witches. The witches order the girl to get them the "caixa de demachiños" ('the little box of demachiños'; 'goblin casket', in Marisa Rey-Henningsen's translation). The girl does not know where to find it, so she wanders off until she finds a donkey whom she feeds with grass instead of straw, a bull she gives bread instead of grass, and a rooster she gives wheat instead of corn. The animals guide her to the place where she can find the box, and the princess enters the house and steals the box. Suddenly, a very old, very ugly woman comes out of the kitchen and wrestles with her for the box, the princess is stronger and flees; the old woman orders the animals to stop her, but they refuse due to the girl's kindness. On the road, she opens the box to see what lies inside, but it is apparently empty. She delivers the box to the witches, but they realize the box is empty, so they send the girl for another box. The princess gets a second box which she does not open, and gives it to the pair. Later, the witch duo forces the girl to gather piles of clothes, wash, dry, mend and iron them before noon. The girl cries over the task, when the ram comes to her and summons an army of rams to fulfill the task. Finally, the princess goes back to her father in the company of the ram and introduces the animal as her saviour. She washes it in a fountain and kisses it; a handsome prince appears before her. The princess then marries the disenchanted prince.

According to scholars Johannes Bolte and Jiri Polívka, Spanish writer Agustín Durán, in his work Romancero General, reported a tale from his childhood: the hero is a Black man named "Gafitas de la Luz"; the heroine, his beloved one, is persecuted by his parents, who force her on tasks; in one of her tasks she is helped by the birds, which cry over the clothes to wash them and iron them with their beaks. Catalan scholar  noted that this tale could refer to type 425B.

See also
 Prunella
 The Little Girl Sold with the Pears
 The Tale about Baba-Yaga (Russian fairy tale)
 The Man and the Girl at the Underground Mansion
 Graciosa and Percinet
 The Green Serpent
 The King of Love
 Ulv Kongesøn (Prince Wolf)
 The Golden Root
 The Horse-Devil and the Witch
 Tulisa, the Wood-Cutter's Daughter
 Khastakhumar and Bibinagar
 Habrmani

Footnotes

References

Further reading
 Alcover, Jaume Vidal. "La fada Morgana en la tradició oral mallorquina". In: Randa no. 11, 1981 (Ejemplar dedicado a: Homenatge a Francesc de B. Moll, III), pp. 179-182. .

ATU 400-459
Catalan folklore
Fictional witches
Spanish fairy tales
Witchcraft in fairy tales
Witches in folklore